Ninzo people (also Gbhu and Ninzam), are an ethnic group in the Middle Belt who speak the Ninzo language, a western Plateau language of Nigeria. The speakers of the Sambe language, a now presumed extinct language spoken in a village with same name have now incorporated with the Ninzo.

Demographics

Distribution
The Ninzo people are found in Sanga LGA of southern Kaduna State and Akwanga LGA of Nasarawa State, Nigeria

Population
An estimation placed the population of the Ninzo people at around 131,000.

Religion

About 6% of the Ninzo are Christian, 49% Muslim and 45% adherents of Traditional religion.

Politics
The Ninzo people are traditionally governed by rulers called the Uchu Ninzo. The Uchu Ninzo, a Second Class Chief, as of 2018 is Uchu (Alh.) Umar Musa. The Ninzo Chiefdom headquarters is at Hate (H. Fadan Wate or Fadan Ninzo).

Language

The Ninzo people speak a Ninzic language, belonging to the western Plateau group of languages.

References

Ethnic groups in Nigeria